Entospletinib is an experimental drug for the treatment of various types of cancer under development by Gilead Sciences.  It is an inhibitor of spleen tyrosine kinase (Syk). It has entered clinical trials for acute myeloid leukaemia (AML), chronic lymphocytic leukemia (CLL), diffuse large B cell lymphoma (DLBCL), graft-versus-host disease (GvHD), hematological malignancies, mantle cell lymphoma (MCL), and non-Hodgkin lymphoma (NHL).

References

Experimental cancer drugs
Tyrosine kinase inhibitors
4-Morpholinyl compunds
Indazoles